Isabelle Li Siyun (born 28 August 1994) is a Singaporean table tennis player who was part of the team that won the women's team event at the 2014 Commonwealth Games. She won a gold medal at the 2008 Commonwealth Youth Games, a silver medal in the women's singles event at the 2010 Summer Youth Olympics, and multiple medals in Southeast Asian Games events.

Personal life
Li went to Chongfu Primary School and Singapore Sports School. She took up table tennis whilst in primary school and also performed Chinese-style dancing. In 2015, Li started studying liberal arts at Yale-NUS College, where she received a scholarship.

Career

Li first competed for Singapore at the age of 11, making her the country's youngest-ever table tennis player. Li won the girls' singles event at the 2008 Commonwealth Youth Games. She competed at the 2009 Asian Youth Games in Singapore. She won a silver medal in the women's singles event at the 2010 Summer Youth Olympics in Singapore, losing to China's Gu Yuting in the final. After the final, Li received a standing ovation from the crowd of 5,000. Li won a silver medal in the women's individual event at the 2011 Southeast Asian Games. In 2013, Li was part of the Singapore team that won gold medals at the Commonwealth Table Tennis Championships and South East Asian Games, as well as winning a silver medal in the individual event at the Southeast Asian Games. Li was part of the Singapore team that won the women's team event at the 2014 Commonwealth Games. Li was one of two Singaporean-born athletes in the Singapore table tennis squad; many of the squad were originally from China.

Li again finished second in the women's team event at the 2015 Southeast Asian Games, beating Hong Kong's Lee Ho Ching in the quarter finals. She was knocked out in the group stages of the women's individual event, having played with a knee injury. Due to her knee injury, Li did not compete for the rest of the 2015, and her next competitive tournament was the 2016 World Team Table Tennis Championships in Kuala Lumpur, Malaysia. That was her last competitive event. In 2017, Li received $55,000 from the Singapore Table Tennis Association as recognition for her achievements.

References

External links
 

1994 births
Living people
Singaporean female table tennis players
Table tennis players at the 2010 Summer Youth Olympics
Table tennis players at the 2014 Commonwealth Games
21st-century Singaporean women
Singaporean sportspeople of Chinese descent
Medalists at the 2014 Asian Games
Table tennis players at the 2014 Asian Games
Asian Games bronze medalists for Singapore
Asian Games medalists in table tennis
Commonwealth Games gold medallists for Singapore
Commonwealth Games medallists in table tennis
Southeast Asian Games medalists in table tennis
Southeast Asian Games gold medalists for Singapore
Southeast Asian Games silver medalists for Singapore
Competitors at the 2011 Southeast Asian Games
Competitors at the 2013 Southeast Asian Games
Competitors at the 2015 Southeast Asian Games
Yale-NUS College alumni
Medallists at the 2014 Commonwealth Games